Sanghamitra Bandyopadhyay (born 1968) is an Indian computer scientist specializing in computational biology. A professor at the Indian Statistical Institute, Kolkata, she is a Shanti Swarup Bhatnagar Prize winner in Engineering Science for 2010, IInfosys Prize 2017 laureate in the Engineering and Computer Science category and TWAS Prize winner for Engineering Sciences in 2018  Her research is mainly in the areas of evolutionary computation, pattern recognition, machine learning and bioinformatics. Since 1 August 2015, she has been the Director of the Indian Statistical Institute, and she would oversee the functioning of all five centres of Indian Statistical Institute located at Kolkata, Bangalore, Delhi, Chennai, and Tezpur besides several other Statistical Quality Control & Operation Research Units spread across India. She is the first woman Director of the Indian Statistical Institute. Currently she is on the Prime Ministers' Science, Technology and Innovation Advisory Council. In 2022 she was given the Padma Shri award for Science and Engineering by the Government of India.

Education and career
Sanghamitra Bandyopadhyay obtained a bachelor of science in physics  from Presidency College, Kolkata before obtaining another bachelor's degree (of technology) in Computer Science in 1992 from Rajabazar Science College Campus of University of Calcutta. She then obtained a master's degree in computer science from the Indian Institute of Technology, Kharagpur before pursuing a Ph. D. at the Indian Statistical Institute, obtaining it in 1998.

Awards and honours
Padma Shri for Science and Engineering, by Government of India, 2022
TWAS Prize for Engineering Sciences, by TWAS, 2018 The World Academy of Sciences 2018.
 Infosys Prize 2017 in Engineering and Computer Science 
Distinguished Alumnus Award, IIT Kharagpur, 2017
 Shanti Swarup Bhatnagar Prize in Engineering Science, 2010
 J. C. Bose Fellowship
 Senior Associate, International Centre for Theoretical Physics (ICTP), Trieste, Italy, 2013-2019.
 Humboldt Fellowship from AvH Foundation, Germany, 2009-2010.
 Swarnajayanti Fellowship, 2006-2007.
Fellow, The World Academy of Sciences (TWAS), 2019.
Fellow, Indian National Science Academy (INSA), 2016.
 IEEE Fellow, 2016
Fellow, Indian National Academy of Engineering (INAE), 2012.
Fellow, National Academy of Sciences, India (NASI), Allahabad, 2010.
Fellow, Indian Academy of Sciences, India (IASc), Bangalore, 2023.

References

External links 
 The Times of India
 ISI faculty personal page

1968 births
Living people
University of Calcutta alumni
Academic staff of the Indian Statistical Institute
Date of birth missing (living people)
Place of birth missing (living people)
TWAS laureates
Recipients of the Shanti Swarup Bhatnagar Award in Engineering Science
Scientists from Kolkata